The 2016 Skate Canada International was the second of six in the 2016–17 ISU Grand Prix of Figure Skating, a senior-level international invitational competition series. It was held at the Hershey Centre in Mississauga, Ontario on October 28–30. Medals were awarded in the disciplines of men's singles, ladies' singles, pair skating, and ice dancing. Skaters earned points toward qualifying for the 2016–17 Grand Prix Final.

Entries
The ISU published the preliminary assignments on June 30, 2016.

Changes to initial assignments

Results

Men

Ladies

Pairs

Ice dancing

References

External links
 2016 Skate Canada International at the International Skating Union

Skate Canada International
Skate Canada International, 2016
Skate Canada
Skate Canada
Sport in Mississauga